The outcome of the elections (in terms of the number of mayors) for Metropolitan municipalities in Turkey is shown below. The number of metropolitan centers was three in 1984 (Ankara, İstanbul and İzmir) and eight in 1989 (with  Adana, Bursa, Gaziantep, Kayseri and Konya). In 1994 the number increased to 15 (with Antalya, Erzurum, Eskişehir, Diyarbakır, Kocaeli, Mersin and Samsun) and in 2004 to 16 (with Sakarya). In 2014 14 new metropolitan municipalities were established. 
The abbreviations for the names of the parties are shown in section Abbreviations.

See also
The number of Turkish municipalities

Abbreviations 
ANAP: Motherland Party (later on merged into True Path Party)
DYP: True Path Party (later on renamed Democratic Party)
DP: Democrat Party
RP: Welfare Party
FP: Virtue Party
SHP: Social Democrat People’s Party (later on merged with CHP)
CHP: Issued from SHP (later on merged with SHP)
DSP: Democratic Left Party
MHP: Nationalist Movement Party (actually in 1989 National Task Party)
HADEP: People’s Democracy Party(In 2004 as a coalition with SHP (not to be confused with SHP above))
DTP: Democratic Society Party
AKP: Justice and Development Party
BDP :Peace and Democracy Party

Notes

References 

Turkey politics-related lists
metropolitan
Politics of Turkey